Alexandria Airlines is an Egyptian airline headquartered in Cairo.

History
The airline was established in 2006 and commenced its operations in March 2007.

In April 2022, it was announced the airline would be resuming operations, from 23 April, from Alexandria to Amman and Kuwait.

Destinations
As of March 2023, Alexandria Airlines operates to the following destinations:

Fleet

Current fleet
, Alexandria Airlines operates the following aircraft:

Former fleet
The airline previously operated two Boeing 737-300 (at August 2017).

Partners
Alexandria Airlines served more than 100 tour operators, as well as airlines such as Nas Air, Buraq Air, Marsland aviation, White Airways, and Palestinian Airlines.

References

Airlines of Egypt
Airlines established in 2007
Egyptian companies established in 2007